Two human polls make up the 2015–16 NCAA Division I men's basketball rankings, the AP Poll and the Coaches Poll, in addition to various publications' preseason polls.

Legend

AP Poll

USA Today Coaches Poll
The Coaches Poll is the second oldest poll still in use after the AP Poll. It is compiled by a rotating group of 31 college Division I head coaches. The Poll operates by Borda count. Each voting member ranks teams from 1 to 25. Each team then receives points for their ranking in reverse order: Number 1 earns 25 points, number 2 earns 24 points, and so forth. The points are then combined and the team with the highest points is then ranked No. 1; second highest is ranked No. 2 and so forth. Only the top 25 teams with points are ranked, with teams receiving first place votes noted the quantity next to their name. The maximum points a single team can earn is 775.

See also
2015–16 NCAA Division I women's basketball rankings

References

College men's basketball rankings in the United States